Leung Fu-wah, BBS, MH, JP (born 21 October 1951, Hong Kong) is a trade unionist and vice-chairman of the Hong Kong Federation of Trade Unions. He was the member of the Legislative Council of Hong Kong in 2000–04 for the Labour. He was awarded the Bronze Bauhinia Star by the SAR government in 2011.

References

1951 births
Living people
HK LegCo Members 2000–2004
Hong Kong trade unionists
Members of the Selection Committee of Hong Kong
Members of the Election Committee of Hong Kong, 2012–2017